Jandir Breno Souza Silva (born 12 November 1998), known as Jája Silva, is a Brazilian professional footballer who plays as a winger for UAE Pro League club Dibba Al Fujairah on loan from Al-Nasr.

Honours
Sampaio Corrêa
Campeonato Maranhense: 2021

References

External links
 

1998 births
Living people
Brazilian footballers
Brazilian expatriate footballers
Association football midfielders
Association football wingers
Campeonato Brasileiro Série B players
Campeonato Brasileiro Série C players
Campeonato Brasileiro Série D players
Liga I players
UAE Pro League players
Goytacaz Futebol Clube players
Boavista Sport Club players
Criciúma Esporte Clube players
Esporte Clube XV de Novembro (Piracicaba) players
Sampaio Corrêa Futebol Clube players
FC Botoșani players
Al-Nasr SC (Dubai) players
Dibba FC players
Brazilian expatriate sportspeople in Romania
Brazilian expatriate sportspeople in the United Arab Emirates
Expatriate footballers in Romania
Expatriate footballers in the United Arab Emirates